The 1948 All-Southern Conference football team consists of American football players chosen by the Associated Press (AP) for the All-Southern Conference football team for the 1948 college football season.

All-Southern Conference selections

Backs
 Charlie Justice, North Carolina (AP-1)
 Bobby Gage, Clemson (AP-1)
 Bill Gregus, Wake Forest (AP-1)
 Jack Cloud, William & Mary (AP-1)

Ends
 John O'Quinn, Wake Forest (AP-1)
 Art Weiner, North Carolina (AP-1)

Tackles
 Len Szafaryn, North Carolina (AP-1)
 Louis Allen, Duke (AP-1)

Guards
 Frank Gillespie, Clemson (AP-1)
 Bernie Watts, North Carolina State (AP-1)

Centers
 Tommy Thompson, William & Mary (AP-1)

Key
AP = Associated Press

See also
1948 College Football All-America Team

References

All-Southern Conference football team
All-Southern Conference football teams